Logan Richardson (born July 29, 1980, Kansas City, Missouri) is an alto saxophonist, composer, bandleader, and producer.

Richardson debuted as a bandleader with his 2007 album Cerebral Flow.  He is also a member of the band NEXT Collective. Recently Richardson just released his major label recording debut entitled SHIFT on Blue Note Records featuring Pat Metheny, Jason Moran, Harish Raghavan, and Nasheet Waits.

Childhood 
Richardson grew up surrounded by the numerous LPs and 45s of his parents. He was constantly immersed in R&B, pop, rock, funk, soul, Motown, and gospel from an early age. His first musical memories include artists such as The Temptations, Stevie Wonder, Prince (musician),  Mahalia Jackson, Phil Collins, James Ingram, Hall & Oates, and Michael Jackson.

Early career 
While attending Paseo Academy of Fine and Performing Arts, Richardson was exposed to jazz personalities who would have a profound impact on his future. Max Roach was the first jazz musician Richardson can remember seeing live. The American Jazz Museum brought Roach to Kansas City frequently in the mid 1990s as a clinician. Richardson also had the opportunity to perform with legendary Kansas City bandleader Jay McShann in the 1990s, in addition to studying with Kansas City Saxophone great, and educator Ahmad Alaadeen. In 1996 Richardson, while still in high school began leading his own groups in Kansas City.

Richardson performed with the Kansas City Symphony in concert February 27, 1997 at the age of 16, when he was invited by then conductor of the Kansas City Symphony Orchestra Bill McGlaughlin, a performance that changed his life.

New York years 
Moving to New York City in August 2001, Richardson witnessed the September 11th attacks first hand. He was enrolled at the New School University where he met, befriended, and performed with young musicians Frank Locrasto, Tommy Crane, Jamire Williams, Joe Sanders, Burniss Earl Travis, Dekel Bor, and teachers Greg Tardy, Carl Allen, Joe Chambers, Billy Hart, and many others including Stefon Harris, JD Allen, Butch Morris, Mulgrew Miller, and more.....

Since 2005, Richardson has led his own group, SHIFT. Featuring Richardson's soloing & compositions, as well as the creative and genre-bending playing of his compatriots, SHIFT attempts to answer the question, "Can there be new music in jazz?"

Richardson has also been a member of drummer Nasheet Waits (son of jazz drummer Freddie Waits) group Equality, a band that has played many top  international festivals such as "North Sea Jazz Festival", and "Jazz Baltica" with pianists Jason Moran, Stanley Cowell, and bassist Tarus Mateen.

On February 27, 2009, Richardson was a member of the much-lauded Monk at Town Hall performance with Jason Moran & Big Bandwagon, culminating in the historic performance at Town Hall celebrating a reshaping of Monk's music by Moran.

Discography 

As leader

 Afrofuturism (Whirlwind Recordings, 2021)
 blues PEOPLE (Ropeadope, 2018)
 Shift (Blue Note, 2015) (featuring Pat Metheny)
 Ethos (Inner Circle Music, 2008) 
 Cerebral Flow (Fresh Sound, 2007)

As sideman
 Modes of Communication: Letters from the Underworlds (2020), Nduduzo Makhathini
 Ancestral Recall (2019), Christian Scott
 Tributary Tales (2017), Gerald Clayton
 Cover Art (2013), NEXT Collective
 Life Forum (2013), Gerald Clayton
 Dream Pursuit (2012), Tony Tixier
 Morgan Rewind: A Tribute to Lee Morgan Vol. 1, (JMood, 2012) Roberto Magris 
 III (2010), Walter Smith III
 Sixty-Eight, (2011) Billy Hart 
 Equality (2009), Nasheet Waits
 The Winding Shell (2009) Jesse Elder
 Prelude... to Cora (2008) Ambrose Akinmusire
 Steps of Faith (2006), Greg Tardy
 The Outlaw (2005), Joe Chambers
 The Golden Republic (2005), The Golden Republic

References 

 Nate Chinen, "New York Times" 12/18/2009, "Latin Jazz Is Staple, but Others Are Invited
 Nate Chinen, "New York Times" 09/04/2009

External links 
 

1980 births
American bandleaders
American male composers
21st-century American composers
American male saxophonists
Living people
Musicians from Kansas City, Missouri
21st-century American saxophonists
21st-century American male musicians
Whirlwind Recordings artists